Mohd Rahman Zabul (born 25 July 1982 in Seremban, Negeri Sembilan) is a Malaysian footballer currently playing for FELDA United F.C. in Malaysian Premier League. He started his career with Negeri Sembilan in 2002 and always played as a right back. Rahman will always be remembered by Deer fans because of his hardwork in helping Negeri Sembilan to win Malaysia Cup (2009), FA Cup (2003 and 2010) and Malaysian Super League (2006).

References

External links
Malaysian Premier League Team Info

Living people
1982 births
Malaysian footballers
Association football defenders
Negeri Sembilan FA players
Johor Darul Ta'zim F.C. players
Felda United F.C. players